Lorin Parys (born 1976) is a Belgian politician and lawyer affiliated to the New Flemish Alliance party.

Biography 
Parys studied law at the University of Namur, KU Leuven, followed by Stellenbosch University in South Africa and the New York University School of Law. He then worked for a legal company in New York City.

After returning to Belgium, he started his political career with the Open VLD and was in second place on the Open VLD list for the House of Representatives in the 2010 elections, but was not elected. In December 2013, he switched parties to the N-VA. In the 2019 Belgian regional elections, he was elected on the N-VA's list to the Flemish Parliament representing the Flemish Brabant constituency. In parliament, he has focused on policy related to the COVID-19 pandemic. In 2021, he was elected vice-chairman of the N-VA along with Valerie Van Peel but later stepped down from the role and suspended political duties after accepting a job in the private sector.

References 

Living people
1976 births
21st-century Belgian politicians
New Flemish Alliance politicians
Members of the Flemish Parliament
20th-century Belgian lawyers